Ömerli is a Turkish place name and may refer to the following places:

 Ömerli, Bandırma, a village
 Ömerli, Çivril
 Ömerli, Ilgaz
 Ömerli, İznik
 Ömerli, Karaisalı, a village in Karaisalı district of Adana Province, Turkey
 Ömerli, Kastamonu, a village in Kastamonu district of Kastamonu Province, Turkey
 Ömerli District, district in Mardin Province
 Ömerli, Mardin, a town and seat of Ömerli District of Mardin Province, Turkey
 Ömerli, Pozantı, a village in Pozantı district of Adana Province, Turkey
 Ömerli, Halfeti, a village in Halfeti district of Şanlıurfa Province, Turkey
 Ömerli Dam, a dam in Istanbul Province, Turkey
 The Turkish name of Galini, Cyprus, a town in northern Cyprus

Turkish toponyms